The Empirical Valence Bond (EVB) approach is an approximation that allows you to calculate reaction free-energies in condensed-phase. It was first developed by Arieh Warshel. And was inspired by the way Marcus theory uses potential surfaces to calculate the probability of electron transfer.

Where most methods for reaction free-energy calculations require at least some part of the modeled system to be treated using quantum mechanics, EVB uses a calibrated Hamiltonian to approximate the potential energy surface of a reaction. For a simple 1 step reaction that typically means that a reaction is modeled using 2 states. These states are valence bond descriptions of the reactants and products of the reaction. The function that gives the ground energy then becomes:

Where H11 and H22 are the valence bond descriptions of the reactant and product state respectively. And H12 is the coupling parameter. The H11 and H22 potentials are usually modeled using force field descriptions Ureactants and Uproducts .  H12 is a bit trickier as it needs to be parameterized using a reference reaction. This reference reaction can be experimental, typically from a reaction in water or other solvents. Alternatively quantum chemical calculations can be used for calibration.

Free energy calculations 
To obtain free-energies from the created ground state energy potential one needs to perform sampling. This can be done using sampling methods like molecular dynamics or Monte Carlo simulations at different states along the reaction coordinates. Typically this is done using a free energy perturbation / umbrella sampling approach.

Application 
EVB has been successfully applied to calculating reaction free energies of enzymes. More recently it has been looked at as a tool to study enzyme evolution and to assist in enzyme design.

Software 

Molaris
Q

See also
 Electron equivalent

References 

Physical chemistry
Reaction mechanisms